Gleb Kalarash (born 29 November 1990) is a Russian handball player for MT Melsungen and the Russian national team.

Achievements

European competitions 
RK Vardar:

 EHF Champions League winner: 2018/19
 SEHA League winner: 2018/19
 SEHA League silver: 2019/20

Domestic competitions 
RK Vardar:

 Macedonian Handball Super League winner: 2018/19, 2020/21
 Macedonian Handball Cup winner: 2020/21

HK Motor:

 Ukrainian Handball League winner: 2015/16, 2016/17

 Ukrainian Supercup winner: 2015/16, 2016/17
Ukrainian Cup winner: 2015/16, 2016/17

HC Saint Petersburg

 Russian Handball League silver: 2013/14
 Russian Handball League bronze: 2014/15,

References

External links

1990 births
Living people
Russian male handball players
Sportspeople from Moscow
Expatriate handball players
Russian expatriate sportspeople in Germany
Russian expatriate sportspeople in North Macedonia
Russian expatriate sportspeople in Ukraine
HC Motor Zaporizhia players
RK Vardar players
Handball-Bundesliga players